Sirius XM Canada Holdings Inc. (commonly referred to as Sirius XM Canada) is a Canadian radio broadcasting company, which operates as a Canadian affiliate of Sirius XM Radio. The company received approval from the Canadian Radio-television and Telecommunications Commission on April 11, 2011 to merge the formerly distinct XM Radio Canada and Sirius Canada services, following the merger of XM Satellite Radio and Sirius Satellite Radio in the United States. The merger was subsequently completed as of June 21, 2011.

Background and history
In their application to the CRTC, XM Canada and Sirius Canada noted that following the merger of Sirius and XM in the United States, they found it increasingly difficult to remain in operation as distinct, competing services in Canada even as the parent services increasingly integrated and amalgamated their programming. In an interview with The Globe and Mail before the merger was approved, Bitove also noted the difficulties that arose from the merged American service becoming a minority shareholder in both of the Canadian companies simultaneously, such as conflicts of interest that forced the American company to leave its Canadian partners out of strategic planning discussions which would have given each company power over decisions affecting the other.

Further complicating matters was that Sirius Canada had far more than half of the total satellite radio subscriber base in Canada, and felt they deserved greater than a 50/50 split of the new company, whereas XM Canada felt that their deal with the National Hockey League — a particularly lucrative prize in Canadian sports broadcasting — warranted a larger share of value in the new company than its subscriber base would suggest.

On November 24, 2010, XM Radio Canada and Sirius Canada announced that they had reached a deal to merge their services.

John Bitove's Canadian Satellite Radio Holdings Inc., the licensee of the former XM Radio Canada, held 30.4% and effective control of the new company. Slaight Communications and the Canadian Broadcasting Corporation (CBC), the primary shareholders in the former Sirius, each held 20.4%, and the American parent Sirius XM held 25%. Both Bitove and Mark Redmond, the former president and CEO of Sirius Canada, hold executive roles with the new company.

As of 2011, Sirius and XM in the United States offered nearly identical programming lineups, with the Canadian-produced channels being among the few remaining distinctions between the two services.

On October 1, 2012, Premier packages became available in Canada. The CBC exited an ownership position in the company in 2017, though CBC channels continue to be broadcast on the SiriusXM platform. In October 2022, CBC-programmed music channels were removed from SiriusXM and replaced with Canadian music channels programmed by SiriusXM; feeds of CBC Radio One and Ici Radio-Canada Première continue to air on SiriusXM.

Pre-merger

Early Days of Sirius Canada
Sirius Canada was a Canadian company, a partnership between Slaight Communications, the Canadian Broadcasting Corporation and Sirius Satellite Radio, which was one of three services licensed by the CRTC on June 16, 2005 to introduce satellite radio service to Canada. In June 2005, the CRTC awarded the company a six-year licence to commence broadcasting in Canada.

Early Days of XM Canada
XM Radio Canada was the operating name of Canadian Satellite Radio Holdings Inc. (or "CSR"), a Canadian communications and media company, which was incorporated in 2002 to broadcast satellite radio in Canada. On August 19, 2003, Canadian Satellite Radio Holdings Inc., the parent company of CSR, filed its initial application to the Canadian Radio-television and Telecommunications Commission (CRTC) for a broadcast licence to provide subscription based digital radio service in Canada. In June 2005, the CRTC awarded the company a six-year licence to commence broadcasting in Canada. XM Radio Canada started transmissions across Canada on November 22, 2005, and launched officially on December 1, 2005.

See also
List of Sirius XM Radio channels

References

External links
 

Canadian radio networks
Canada
Radio broadcasting companies of Canada
Canadian Broadcasting Corporation
Slaight Communications
Entertainment companies established in 2011
Companies based in Toronto
Companies formerly listed on the Toronto Stock Exchange